Chats (also, Chat) is a former settlement in Lassen County, California. Chats still appeared on maps as of 1894.

The Chat post office operated from 1885 to 1894, and from 1896 to 1900. The name is of Native American origin.

References

Former settlements in Lassen County, California
Former populated places in California